Sick Note is a British black comedy television series starring Rupert Grint and Nick Frost. It was created and written by Nat Saunders and James Serafinowicz and directed by Matt Lipsey. It first aired on 7 November 2017 on Sky One. In April 2017, it was reported that a second series had been commissioned before the first had aired. It became available for streaming on Netflix worldwide from November 2018.

In April 2021, Saunders stated the series was "neither recommissioned or cancelled, just in TV show limbo" when asked on Twitter about its status, adding that a return seemed unlikely. Serafinowicz had previously shared similar thoughts and revealed they "wrote the first 2 episodes of season 3 but nothing ever happened."

Plot
When insurance agent Daniel Glass (Rupert Grint) is misdiagnosed with terminal oesophageal cancer, due to his incompetent doctor (Nick Frost), he begins to notice that everyone around him treats him better and he decides not to tell. This leads to more lies and secrets which need to be covered up. Daniel and the doctor become allies as each have something to gain by maintaining the façade; however, they attract the attention of a local policeman who believes Daniel may have been involved in a murder case. As more people become involved the web of lies begin to grow and eventually serious crimes are committed.

Cast

Series 1
 Rupert Grint as Daniel Glass
 Nick Frost as  Dr. Iain Glennis
 Don Johnson as Kenny West
 Pippa Bennett-Warner as Becca Palmerstone
 Marama Corlett as Linda
 Tolu Ogunmefun as Ash Matthews
 Lolly Adefope as Lisa
 Belinda Stewart-Wilson as Annette Glennis
 Karl Theobald as Michael
 Matilda Thorpe as Claire Glass
 Camilla Beeput as Vanessa Matthews
 Miles Richardson as Dr. Sampson
 David Cann as Gordon Glass 
 Daniel Rigby as Officer Hayward

Series 2
 Lindsay Lohan as Katerina West
 Alison King as Superintendent Henchy
 Dustin Demri-Burns as Will_5000

Episodes

Series 1 (2017)

Series 2 (2018)

Home media
The first season was released on DVD on 21 October 2019. The second season was released on 17 February 2020.

Reception
Sick Note received mixed reviews from critics. On review aggregator Rotten Tomatoes, the first season has a 50% approval rating based on 6 reviews. Rupert Hawksley of The Daily Telegraph stated the premise "is not a bad one at all" but ultimately finds that the "cast is wasted" due to the writing, claiming that the "jokes landed with all the grace of an injured pheasant." Brad Newsome of the Sydney Morning Herald described the series by saying, "Rupert Grint, Nick Frost and Don Johnson are all very naughty boys in this dark but agreeably untaxing British comedy series." Barbara Ellen of The Guardian considered the "performances are great and there are plenty of laughs in the escalating twists of surrealist failure." In an article by James Rampton for The Independent, it is characterized as "dark, but silly as well. It's Breaking Bad meets Fawlty Towers," and "cleverly fuses light and shade."

In a review for Paste Magazine, LaToya Ferguson also writes that Sick Note has a "pretty solid premise" but the series is "wildly uneven," it "has a singular narrative and aesthetic vision, and it never once veers from that, no matter what", continuing that the addition of Lohan to the second season "doesn't read as an attempt to course-correct, it probably should've been," although her character "meshes much better with the story as a whole. Especially, as she almost, sort of, but not quite solves the show's woman problem."

Accolades

References

External links
 Sick Note at Netflix

2017 British television series debuts
2018 British television series endings
2010s British black comedy television series
2010s British sitcoms
Adultery in television
English-language television shows
Sky UK original programming
Television shows set in England